In 1983, the Sportswriters' Association of Western Australia proposed a Western Australian Hall of Champions to honour past athletes from the state who had made a significant impact in their sport. The Government of Western Australia asked the then-recently created Western Australian Institute of Sport (WAIS) to develop the concept and the Hall of Champions was inaugurated by Keith Wilson, the Minister for Sport and Recreation, on 19 August 1985.

Fourteen foundation inductees were made in 1985 and since then several new inductees are made each year at a dinner hosted by WAIS.  The award is the highest honour that can be accorded a West Australian sportsperson.

The induction criteria are:
The person must have achieved the highest level of open competition in his/her sport;
The person must be product of the Western Australian sporting system, or have established their reputation while living in and representing Western Australia;
The person must been retired from open competition for at least five years.

The award is separate from the Western Australian Sports Star of the Year which is given to currently competing sportspeople.

Inductees

References

Hall
Australian sports trophies and awards
All-sports halls of fame
Halls of fame in Western Australia
Awards established in 1985
Australian hall of fame inductees
1985 establishments in Australia
Lists of sportspeople from Western Australia